The Directorate-General for Neighbourhood and Enlargement Negotiations (DG NEAR)  is a Directorate-General of the European Commission. The body is responsible for the enlargement process of the European Union and for the European Neighbourhood Policy. The European Union over the years has expanded to 27 members from the first six Member States who signed the Treaty of Rome.

The current Director-General is Gert Jan Koopman, the former Director-General for Budget. The Directorate-General is organised into five Directorates, plus the Support Group for Ukraine (SGUA).
Directorate A: Thematic support, coordination of policy and financial instruments
Directorate B: Neighbourhood South and Turkey
Directorate C: Neighbourhood East and Institution Building
Directorate D: Western Balkans
Directorate E: Resources
Support Group for Ukraine (SGUA)

See also
European Commissioner for Neighbourhood and Enlargement
European Neighbourhood Policy
Stabilisation and Association Process
Instrument for Structural Policies for Pre-Accession (ISPRA)
Phare
Special Accession Programme for Agriculture and Rural Development (SAPARD)
Statistics relating to enlargement of the European Union
European Agency for Reconstruction

References

External links
Directorate-General for Neighbourhood Policy and Enlargement Negotiations
EU enlargement
Questions and Answers about EU enlargement

Enlargement
Enlargement of the European Union